Glutamate rich protein 5 is a protein in humans encoded by the ERICH5 gene, also known as chromosome 8 open reading frame 47 (C8orf47).

Gene 
The ERICH5 gene is located on human chromosome 8 at 8q22.2 and spans 29 kb on the plus strand of the DNA. ERICH5 contains three exons and two introns. ERICH5 is also known as C8orf47 and glutamate rich 5.

Protein

Isoforms 
The ERICH5 protein has two isofroms. The longest isofrom, isofrom 1, spans 1,550 base pairs and is composed of 374 amino acids. The second isoform lacks the third and final exon and is 596 base pairs long.

Domains and motifs 
ERICH5 contains one conserved domain, a domain of unknown function called DUF4573. ERICH5 is predicted to contain two highly conserved motifs, an APC/C binding motif and the LIG_FHA_2 motif. The APC/C motif spans amino acid 222-226 and serves as a binding site for the anaphase-promoting complex. The LIG_FHA_2 motif is involved in the cell checkpoint pathway and is found in many proteins localized in the nucleus that regulate cell cycle.

Post-translational modifications 
ERICH5 is predicted to undergo several post-translational modifications including phosphorylation, O-glycosylation, and sumoylation. Many of the phosphorylation sites and O-glycosylation sites were predicted at the same amino acid. The post translational modifications shown are those conserved among ERICH5 orthologs. Several kinases were predicted to phosphorylate ERICH5 including PKC, cdc2, CKI, PKA, DNAPK, ATM, EGFR, and CKII.

Secondary structure 
ERICH5 was predicted to contain three alpha helices and two beta sheets as well as regions of random coils.

Sub-cellular localization 
ERICH5 was predicted to be localized in the nucleus.

Protein interactions 
ERICH5 was predicted to interact with several proteins through yeast two-hybrid screening and affinity chromatography. Several of the proteins ERICH5 was predicted to interact with were also localized in the nucleus.

Expression

Normal expression 
ERICH5 shows elevated levels of expression in the fetal liver, liver, pancreas, and retina compared to other tissues.

Expression in disease 

ERICH5 shows increased expression in Alcoholic Hepatitis.

Homology

Paralogs 
There are no known paralogs of ERICH5.

Orthologs 
True orthologs of ERICH5 have only been identified among mammalian species. The most distantly related mammalian ortholog is in Monodelphis domestica,  or the gray short-tailed opossum.

Distant orthologs 
ERICH5 has distant orthologs among birds and reptiles. These distant orthologs contain only the third exon of ERICH5.

References